Anhydro-N-acetylmuramic acid kinase (anhMurNAc kinase, AnmK) is an enzyme with systematic name ATP:1,6-anhydro-N-acetyl-beta-muramate 6-phosphotransferase. This enzyme catalyses the following chemical reaction

 ATP + 1,6-anhydro-N-acetyl-beta-muramate + H2O  ADP + N-acetylmuramate 6-phosphate

This enzyme is required for the utilization of anhydro-N-acetylmuramic acid in Pseudomonadota.

References

External links 
 

EC 2.7.1